Daniel Stenderup (born 31 May 1989) is a Danish professional footballer who plays as a centre-back for Danish 1st Division club Hvidovre IF.

Career
Stenederup joined FC Roskilde in January 2017. He confirmed his departure from the club on 10 July 2019. On 20 August 2019, he moved to Danish 1st Division club Hvidovre IF.

References

External links
 Daniel Stenderup on DBU
 Daniel Stenderup on Soccerway

1989 births
Living people
Danish men's footballers
Brøndby IF players
Esbjerg fB players
FC Roskilde players
Hvidovre IF players
Danish Superliga players
Danish 1st Division players
Denmark under-21 international footballers
Association football central defenders
Denmark youth international footballers
Footballers from Copenhagen